
Gmina Kościan is a rural gmina (administrative district) in Kościan County, Greater Poland Voivodeship, in west-central Poland. Its seat is the town of Kościan, although the town is not part of the territory of the gmina.

The gmina contains part of the protected area called Chłapowski Landscape Park.

Villages
Gmina Kościan contains the villages and settlements of Bonikowo, Choryń, Czarkowo, Darnowo, Granecznik, Gryżyna, Gryżynka, Gurostwo, Ignacewo, Januszewo, Katarzynin, Kawczyn, Kiełczewo, Kobylniki, Kokorzyn, Krzan, Kurowo, Kurza Góra, Łagiewniki, Mała Wyskoć, Mikoszki, Nacław, Nielęgowo, Nowe Oborzyska, Nowy Dębiec, Nowy Lubosz, Osiek, Pelikan, Pianowo, Ponin, Racot, Sepienko, Sierakowo, Spytkówki, Stare Oborzyska, Stary Lubosz, Szczodrowo, Tamborowo, Turew, Widziszewo, Witkówki, Wławie, Wronowo and Wyskoć.

Neighbouring gminas
Gmina Kościan is bordered by the town of Kościan and by the gminas of Czempiń, Kamieniec, Krzywiń, Śmigiel and Stęszew.

References

External links
 Polish official population figures 2006

Koscian
Kościan County